The 1926 NFL season was the seventh regular season of the National Football League. The league grew to 22 teams, a figure that would not be equaled in professional football until 1961, adding the Brooklyn Lions, the Hartford Blues, the Los Angeles Buccaneers, and the Louisville Colonels, with the Racine Tornadoes re-entering. The Cleveland Bulldogs sat out the season, the Rock Island Independents defected to the upstart American Football League, and the Rochester Jeffersons suspended operations for the final time (eventually folding in early 1928). The Akron Pros re-branded as the Akron Indians, the Duluth Kelleys as the Duluth Eskimos and the Buffalo Bison as the Buffalo Rangers (the team also used the names "Texas Rangers" and "Buffalo Cowboys"). .

The Buccaneers, Eskimos, Colonels and Buffalo Rangers were "showcase teams," the first efforts for the league to reach beyond the northeast and midwest. The Buccaneers, a response to the AFL's Los Angeles Wildcats, represented the state of California; the Eskimos the far northern plains, while the Colonels represented the Southern United States and the Rangers represented the state of Texas and other areas of the Southwestern United States. The four teams (except the Rangers) all played primarily as traveling teams. Three of the four teams only lasted one season; the Buccaneers and Colonels both folded while the Rangers reverted to their previous status as the Bison, and only the Eskimos returned for 1927.

In mid-November, Brooklyn merged with the AFL's Brooklyn Horsemen and stayed in the NFL, playing one more game as the Lions before changing its name to the Brooklyn Horsemen for the last three games (all shutout losses). 

The Frankford Yellow Jackets were named the NFL champions after finishing the season with the best record.

Teams
The league grew to 22 teams.

Standings

References
 NFL Record and Fact Book
 NFL History 1921–1930 (Last accessed December 4, 2005)
 David S. Neft, Richard M. Cohen, and Rick Korch, The Football Encyclopedia: The Complete, Year-by-Year History of Professional Football From 1892 to the Present (St. Martin's Press 1994) 
 Total Football: The Official Encyclopedia of the National Football League

See also
1926 American Football League season

1926